This is a list of topics typically studied by students of industrial archaeology.

It is grouped into industry sectors: Extractive, Manufacturing, Public Utilities, Transport, Miscellaneous.

Extractive

Mining
 Adit
 Air vent
 Mine, Copper mine, Coal mine, Gold mine, Tin mine, Zinc mine
 Shaft mining

Quarrying
 Clayworks
 Sand pits
 Gravel pit
 Powder house

Manufacturing 
 Beam engine
 Brewery
 Brewing
 Brick kiln
 Cement works
 Creamery
 Dairy
 Distillery
 Distilling
 Factory
 Forge
 glass
 Granary
 Hopper
 Kiln
 Pottery
 Silk Industry
 Spinning, Spinning jenny, Spinning mill, Spinning mule
 Stationary engine
 Steam engine
 Warehouse
 Weaving, Loom, Jacquard loom, Dobby loom, Shaft loom, Power loom, Flying shuttle
 Windpump

Mills
 Boring mill
 Cotton mill
 Five-sail windmill
 Flax mill
 Flint mill
 Fulling mill - see Fulling
 Gristmill
 Hand mill
 Iron mill
 Lumber mill
 Millrace
 Mill engine
 Mill stone
 Oil mill
 Post mill
 Rolling mill
 Saw mill
 Smock mill
 Spinning mill
 Steel rolling mill
 Tailrace
 Textile mill
 Tide mill
 Tower mill
 Watermill
 Waterwheel
 Windmill
 Woollen mill

Public Utilities

Electricity
 Power station
 Turbine

Gas
 Gasometer
 Retort house

Water
 Dam
 Pumping station
 Reservoir
 Sewage treatment
 Water treatment
 Water tower

Steam
 District heating

Hydraulic power
 Hydraulic power network

Transport

Aviation

Canals
 Aqueduct
 Canal basin
 Boat lift
 Bridge
 Canal lock
 Culvert
 Flash lock
 Flights of locks
 Inclined plane
 Spillover

Railways
 Air vent
 Ballast pit
 Bridge
 Buffer stops
 Carriage Shed
 Catch point
 Cattle Pens
 Crane
 Crossover
 Culvert
 Cutting
 Embankment
 Footbridge
 Gantry crane (Portainer)
 Goods area
 Goods store
 Ground frame
 Horse tram
 Inclined plane
 Junction (rail)
 Loading bank
 Locomotive shed
 Level crossing
 Milepost
 Platform
 Ropeway
 Signal box (Signal cabin)
 Station
 Station building
 Station house
 Subway
 Track
 Trackbed
 Tram
 Tunnel
 Turnout
 Turntable
 Underpass
 Viaduct
 Waiting room
 Water column
 Water tank
 Water tower

Marine
 Causeway
 Dry dock
 Dock
 Harbour
 Lighthouse
 Pier
 Pump house
 Quay
 Slipway
 Weir

Road
 Bridge
 Unused highway
 Toll road

Miscellaneous 
 Chimney
 Hydraulic pump
 Market house
 Weighbridge

See also
 List of conservation topics
 Conservation in the United Kingdom
 History of science and technology
 Association for Industrial Archaeology
 Society for Industrial Archeology

Archaeology
 
Industrial archaeology
Industrial archaeology
Industry